Sick Boy is an American Indie horror-thriller, written and directed by Tim T. Cunningham and starring Skye McCole Bartusiak, Marc Donato and Debbie Rochon. It was Bartusiak's final film role before her death in 2014.

Premise
Lucy (Skye McCole Bartusiak), a trainee dentist, lands a job of a lifetime as a babysitter for a very rich family whose young son Jeremy is confined to his room due to a mysterious illness, she later discovers that his mother (Debbie Rochon), is keeping a deadly secret.

Cast
 Skye McCole Bartusiak - Lucy
 Marc Donato - Chris
 Debbie Rochon - Dr. Helen Gordon
 Cas Rooney - Jeremy Gordon
 Greg Dorchak - Walter Gordon
 Pierre Kennel - Officer Andy Pohlman
 Teresa Valenza - Alice
 Joe Calvin Anderson - Hospital Police Officer (as Joe Anderson)

Film rating
The film is rated R16 in New Zealand for horror scenes and violence.
It has also been rated 18 in the United Kingdom by the BBFC for containing strong violence and gore.

Reception
Nerdly said, "there’s enough original ideas here to keep even the most jaded of zombie movie fan watching."  Another reviewer said, "With a decent enough budget, what most will really remember about Sick Boy is the cinematography. It looks great and helps ramp up the tension during the middle portion of the film which is when it’s at its best. Such a shame."

References

External links
 
 
 

2012 horror thriller films